Clinton A. J. Duffy (born c.1966) is a New Zealand marine scientist, who works in the Marine Conservation Unit of the Department of Conservation. Duffy is a shark expert, whose work  includes the taxonomy and conservation status of New Zealand's deepwater dogfishes, attaching GPS wildlife tracking devices to great white sharks, and surveying basking sharks.

He performed the public dissection of a great white shark at the Auckland Museum in 2009.

Duffy has BSc and MSc degrees from the University of Canterbury.

References

External links 

Clinton Duffy-Visitor to the Australian Museum Fish Site

Living people
New Zealand marine biologists
New Zealand taxonomists
University of Canterbury alumni
Year of birth missing (living people)